The flag of Wrocław is formed by two horizontal bands of equal width — yellow on the bottom and red on the top. On the vertical banners, the red stripe is on the left, the yellow stripe on the right.

It was adopted originally in 1938.

Until 1938, the colors of Wrocław were red and white in the form of horizontal stripes: four (2 red + 2 white) or five (3 red + 2 white). Before 1938 the city flag with a coat of arms was also used.

Gallery

See also
 Flag of Silesia
 Flag of Brno

References

External links

Flag
Flag
Flags of cities in Poland
Flags introduced in 1938